The First Men in the Moon is a scientific romance by the English author H. G. Wells, originally serialised in The Strand Magazine from December 1900 to August 1901 and published in hardcover in 1901, who called it one of his "fantastic stories". The novel tells the story of a journey to the Moon undertaken by the two protagonists: a businessman narrator, Mr. Bedford; and an eccentric scientist, Mr. Cavor. Bedford and Cavor discover that the Moon is inhabited by a sophisticated extraterrestrial civilisation of insect-like creatures they call "Selenites". The inspiration seems to come from the famous 1870 book by Jules Verne, From the Earth to the Moon, and the opera by Jacques Offenbach from 1875. In that opera the word "selenites" is used for the first time for moon inhabitants.

Plot summary

The narrator is a London businessman named Bedford who withdraws to the countryside to write a play, by which he hopes to alleviate his financial problems. Bedford rents a small countryside house in Lympne, in Kent, where he wants to work in peace. He is bothered every afternoon, however, at precisely the same time, by a passer-by making odd noises. After two weeks Bedford accosts the man, who proves to be a reclusive physicist named Mr. Cavor.  Bedford befriends Cavor when he learns he is developing a new material, cavorite, which can negate the force of gravity. 	

When a sheet of cavorite is prematurely processed, it makes the air above it weightless and shoots off into space. Bedford sees in the commercial production of cavorite a possible source of "wealth enough to work any sort of social revolution we fancied; we might own and order the whole world". Cavor hits upon the idea of a spherical spaceship made of "steel, lined with glass", and with sliding "windows or blinds" made of cavorite by which it can be steered, and persuades a reluctant Bedford to undertake a voyage to the Moon; Cavor is certain there is no life there. 	 		
On the way to the Moon, they experience weightlessness, which Bedford finds "exceedingly restful". On the surface of the Moon the two men discover a desolate landscape, but as the Sun rises, the thin, frozen atmosphere vaporises and strange plants begin to grow with extraordinary rapidity. Bedford and Cavor leave the capsule, but in romping about get lost in the rapidly growing jungle. They hear for the first time a mysterious booming coming from beneath their feet.  They encounter "great beasts", "monsters of mere fatness", that they dub "mooncalves", and five-foot-high "Selenites" tending them. At first they hide and crawl about, but growing hungry partake of some "monstrous coralline growths" of fungus that inebriate them. They wander drunkenly until they encounter a party of six extraterrestrials, who capture them. The insectoid lunar natives (referred to as "Selenites", after Selene, the  Greek moon goddess) are part of a complex and technologically sophisticated society that lives underground, but this is revealed only in radio communications received from Cavor after Bedford's return to Earth.

Bedford and Cavor break out of captivity beneath the surface of the Moon and flee, killing several Selenites. In their flight they discover that gold is common on the Moon. In their attempt to find their way back to the surface and to their sphere, they come upon some Selenites carving up mooncalves but fight their way past. Back on the surface, they split up to search for their spaceship. Bedford finds it but returns to Earth without Cavor, who injured himself in a fall and was recaptured by the Selenites, as Bedford learns from a hastily scribbled note he left behind.

Chapter 20, "Mr. Bedford in Infinite Space", plays no role in the plot but is a remarkable set piece in which the narrator describes experiencing a quasi-mystical "pervading doubt of my own identity. . . the doubts within me could still argue: 'It is not you that is reading, it is Bedford—but you are not Bedford, you know.  That's just where the mistake comes in.'  'Counfound it!' I cried, 'and if I am not Bedford, what am I?  But in that direction no light was forthcoming, though the strangest fancies came drifting into my brain, queer remote suspicions like shadow seem from far away... Do you know I had an idea that really I was something quite outside not only the world, but all worlds, and out of space and time, and that this poor Bedford was just a peephole through which I looked at life..."

By good fortune, the narrator lands in the sea off the coast of Britain, near the seaside town of Littlestone, not far from his point of departure. His fortune is made by some gold he brings back, but he loses the sphere when a curious boy named Tommy Simmons climbs into the unattended sphere and shoots off into space.  Bedford writes and publishes his story in The Strand Magazine, then learns that "Mr. Julius Wendigee, a Dutch electrician, who has been experimenting with certain apparatus akin to the apparatus used by Mr. Tesla in America", has picked up fragments of radio communications from Cavor sent from inside the Moon. During a period of relative freedom Cavor has taught two Selenites English and learned much about lunar society.

Cavor's account explains that Selenites exist in thousands of forms and find fulfilment in carrying out the specific social function for which they have been brought up: specialisation is the essence of Selenite society. "With knowledge the Selenites grew and changed; mankind stored their knowledge about them and remained brutes—equipped," remarks the Grand Lunar, when he finally meets Cavor and hears about life on Earth. Unfortunately, Cavor reveals humanity's propensity for war; the lunar leader and those listening to the interview are "stricken with amazement".  Bedford infers that it is for this reason that Cavor has been prevented from further broadcasting to Earth. Cavor's transmissions are cut off as he is trying to describe how to make cavorite.  His final fate is unknown, but Bedford is sure that "we shall never… receive another message from the moon".

Influence on C. S. Lewis
C. S. Lewis explicitly stated that his science fiction books were both inspired by and written as an antithesis to those of H. G. Wells. Specifically, he acknowledged The First Men in The Moon to be "the best of the sort [of science fiction] I have read...." (from a letter to Roger Lancelyn Green).

The influence of Wells's book is especially visible in Out of the Silent Planet, the first book of Lewis's Space Trilogy. There, too, a central role in the story line is played by a partnership between a worldly businessman interested in the material gains from space travel (and specifically, in importing extraterrestrial gold to Earth) and a scientist with wider cosmic theories.

Also in Lewis's book, the two quietly build themselves a spaceship in the seclusion of an English country house, and take off into space without being noticed by the rest of the world. (It may be noted that both Wells and Lewis, like virtually all science fiction writers until the 1950s, grossly underestimated the resources needed for even the smallest jaunt outside Earth's gravitational field.) Like Wells's book, Lewis's reaches its climax with the Earth scientist speaking to the wise ruler of an alien world (in this case Oyarsa, the ruler of Malacandra/Mars) and blurting out the warlike and predatory nature of humanity.

However, in Lewis's book the businessman-scientist pair are the villains of the piece. Moreover, his scientist, Professor Weston, has a philosophy diametrically opposite to Cavor's, being an outspoken proponent of human colonisation of other planets, up to and including extermination of "primitive natives".

Other influences, references, and adaptations

Brian Stableford argues this is the first alien dystopia. The book could also be considered to have launched the science fiction subgenre depicting intelligent social insects, in some cases a non-human species such as the space-traveling Shaara "bees" in the future universe of A. Bertram Chandler, in others (such as Frank Herbert's Hellstrom's Hive) humans who evolved or consciously engineered their society in this direction. Nigel Kneale co-adapted the screenplay (with Jan Read) for the 1964 film version; it is reasonable to assume that Kneale's familiarity with the work may have inspired the idea of the Martian hives which feature so significantly in  Quatermass and the Pit, one of Kneale's most-admired creations.
In the 1925 novel Menace from the Moon, by English writer Bohun Lynch, a lunar colony, founded 1654 by a Dutchman, an Englishman, an Italian, and "their women", threatens Earth with heat-ray doom unless it helps them escape their dying world.
Cavorite was featured as a major plot device in the 1999 first volume of The League of Extraordinary Gentlemen, and Cavor (given the first name of Selwyn) also appears in the volume and is mentioned in The League of Extraordinary Gentlemen: Black Dossier. In The League of Extraordinary Gentlemen, Volume III: Century, the Selenites are featured as enemies of the nude lunar Amazons.
Cavorite also is used as a minor plot device in Warehouse 13, with its gravity blocking properties used by Wells to make a trap.
Cavorite and Cavor also play a major role in the end of Scarlet Traces: The Great Game, with the Selenites also briefly depicted.
The video game Voyage: Inspired by Jules Verne was based both on Wells's The First Men in the Moon, along with Jules Verne's From the Earth to the Moon and Around the Moon.
Cavorite, Cavor, and the Selenites are a large factor in The Martian War, where Cavor's ship takes Wells, his wife, and T.H. Huxley first to the Moon, then to Mars. In the story, the Selenites have been enslaved by the Martians, used as food creatures and slaves to build the canals and invasion fleet.
In the short story "Moon Ants" by Zinaida Gippius, the narrator is attempting to understand the reason for a sharp increase of local suicides and for the suicide mindset in general.  At one point he recollects Wells's novel and eventually decides that mankind, or just Russia in general, has become much like the Selenites in its decadent, self-destructive culture. Like the Selenites, man is seemingly tough on the outside but easily knocked aside, to crumple up and die, by the rigors of life.
The events of The First Men in the Moon are used as the precursor to the player's adventure in Larry Niven and Steven Barnes' "Dream Park" series adventure novel, The Moon Maze Game, which describes a fantasy role playing game being played on (and televised from) a crater and tunnels on the Moon.
An antigravity material called "cavorite" also appears in Vernor Vinge's novel A Deepness in the Sky.
A substance similar to cavorite (called gravitar) is used in Space: 1889 & Beyond, which also features a character called Rear Admiral Herbert Cavor and the indigenous population of Luna are called Selenites (the name being derived from the same source material mentioned in The First Men in the Moon). This series also features a character called Commander George Bedford. According to author Andy Frankham-Allen (who also developed the series) this was all a very intentional reference to the works of H. G. Wells, with the main protagonist, Professor Nathanial Stone, a direct reference to Parson Nathaniel from Jeff Wayne's War of the Worlds; Nathanial Stone's father is a reverend.
Cavorite also lent its name to an alien material in Robert Buettner's Jason Wanderer/Orphan's Legacy novels, with the material being named after H.G. Wells' cavorite due to their similar properties.
Cavorite again shows up (with similar properties) in the Japanese anime Princess Principal, set in an alternate history fin-de-siècle steampunk Britain.
Cavorite is present in James A. Owen's Chronicles of the Imaginarium Geographica book series, in which it is described as an incredibly powerful material used in the creation of the Keep of Time and the Zanzibar Gate. It has relatively little relation to the material in The First Men in the Moon.
 In the Night Terrace episode "Full Steam", cavorite is cited as the miraculous mineral capable of allowing the SSS Implausible, a steam-powered spaceship, to function as though it were an ocean-going steamship. However, Eddie Jones (having read The First Men in the Moon) sees through the deception, being the first in the ship's sixty-year service history to notice; he, Anastasia Black and Susan Denholm later learn that it is in fact another time-and-space-travelling terrace house from the same street as Anastasia's that is the source of the Implausible'''s power.

Film adaptationsThe First Men in the Moon has been adapted to film four times, and once prior to that as a mash-up Verne-Wells film:
 A Trip to the Moon (1902) was released one year after the publication of Wells's book. Some film historians, most notably Georges Sadoul, have regarded the film as a combination of two Jules Verne novels (From the Earth to the Moon and Around the Moon) plus adventures on the Moon taken from Wells's book. More recent scholarship, however, suggests that A Trip to the Moon draws on a wider variety of source materials, and it is unclear to what extent its filmmaker was familiar with Wells.
 The first adaptation was made in 1919; the first film made from a science fiction novel.
 The second adaptation was made in 1964. In this version, the men wear diving suits as spacesuits, which they do not do in the original novel.
 The third adaptation was made for TV in 2010; this is the version most faithful to the novel.
 The fourth adaptation, in 3D, by David Rosler, was in production from 2009 to 2010.

Criticism
Soon after the publication of The First Men in the Moon, Wells was accused by the Irish writer Robert Cromie of having stolen from his novel A Plunge into Space (1890), which used an antigravity device similar to that in Chrysostom Trueman's The History of a Voyage to the Moon'' (1864). Both novels had certain elements in common, such as a globular spaceship built in secret after inventing a way to overcome Earth's gravity. Wells simply replied: "I have never heard of Mr Cromie nor of the book he attempts to advertise by insinuations of plagiarism on my part."

Jules Verne was publicly hostile to Wells's novel mainly due to Wells having his characters go to the moon via a totally fictional creation of an anti-gravitational material rather than the actual use of technology.

See also 
 Apergy
 Apollo 8
 Apollo 11
 Private spaceflight
 Moon in fiction
 Moon landings in fiction
 1901 in science fiction

References

External links

 
 
 The First Men in the Moon audiobook – Streams online.
 

1901 British novels
1901 science fiction novels
British science fiction novels
British novels adapted into films
Dystopian novels
Space exploration novels
Novels set on the Moon
Novels by H. G. Wells
Novels involved in plagiarism controversies
Novels first published in serial form
George Newnes Ltd books